Booze Britain is a fly-on-the-wall documentary television series produced by Granada that aired on British satellite TV channel Bravo in half-hour episodes which document the binge drinking culture of various towns and cities in the United Kingdom, typically following the main star of the show, G 'the tank' Hutt. The series follows a group of friends as they indulge in an evening drinking heavily in various establishments usually in their own town or city, police officers fining and arresting people for various alcohol-related incidents and also paramedics who are called out to handle the consequences of drunkenness. The narration by Mark Womack provides alcohol-related statistics and comments on medical issues raised by the scenes depicted.

Its second series, subtitled Binge Nation, visits numerous places in the country.

See also
 Lad culture
 Broken Britain

References

External links
 Booze Britain Map of pubs and clubs in Britain

2004 British television series debuts
2004 British television series endings
Alcohol abuse in the United Kingdom
Drinking culture
Alcohol in the United Kingdom
Urban decay in Europe
2000s British documentary television series
Bravo (British TV channel) original programming
Television series by ITV Studios
Television shows produced by Granada Television
English-language television shows